Theophanes may refer to:

Saints
Theodorus and Theophanes  (ca. 778-845), called the Grapti, proponents of the veneration of images during the second Iconoclastic controversy
Theophanes the Confessor Byzantine 8th-9th-century historian
Theophan the Recluse (1815–1894) Russian saint
Théophane Vénard (1821-1869) one of the Vietnamese Martyrs

Others
Theophanes of Mytilene (1st century BC) political figure and historian in Lesbos
Theophanes of Byzantium (6th century) Byzantine historian
Theophanes the Branded (also called Theophanes Graptus or Theophanes of Nicea, 775-845), Byzantine monk and hymnographer
Theophanes Continuatus Latin name applied to a chronicle continuing the history of Theophanes the Confessor
 Theophanes (chamberlain) (fl.c. 920-945) Byzantine official and chief minister of Emperor Romanos Lekapenos
 Theophanes Nonnus (fl.c. 950), Byzantine physician who wrote outline of medicine dedicated to Emperor Constantine VII Porphyrogenitus
Theophanes Kerameus (1129-1152) bishop of Rossano, in  Italy, and a celebrated homiletic writer.
Theophanes the Greek (ca. 1340-1410) Byzantine icon painter that worked in Russia
Theophanes the Cretan (active 1527-48) Cretan icon painter
Theophanes (Kim) (born 1976), Archbishop of the Russian Orthodox diocese of Korea

See also
Theofanis, modern variant of this name
Theophano (disambiguation), a female form of the name
Theophania (disambiguation), a female form of the name

Theophoric names